Bruce Savage (born 22 August 1962, in Johannesburg) is a sailor from South Africa, who represented his country at the 1992 Summer Olympics in Barcelona, Spain as helmsman in the Soling. With crew members Giles Stanley and Rick Mayhew they took the 14th place. Bruce with crew members Rick Mayhew and Clynton Lehman took 11th place during the 1996 Summer Olympics in Savannah, United States as helmsman in the Soling.

References

1962 births
Living people
South African male sailors (sport)
Sailors at the 1992 Summer Olympics – Soling
Sailors at the 1996 Summer Olympics – Soling
Olympic sailors of South Africa
Sportspeople from Johannesburg